The Norwegian Church Arts Centre is a point of cultural and historical interest located in Cardiff Bay (Tiger Bay), Wales. It was a Lutheran Church, consecrated in 1868. Under the patronage of The Norwegian Seamen's Mission provided home comforts, communication with family and a place of worship for Scandinavian sailors and the Norwegian community in Cardiff for over a hundred years.

History
In the 19th century, Cardiff was one of Britain's three major ports, along with London and Liverpool. The Norwegian merchant fleet at the time was the third largest in the world, and Cardiff became one of the major centres of its operations.

Sjømannskirken – the Norwegian Church Abroad organisation, which is part of the Church of Norway – followed in its footsteps. Under Carl Herman Lund from Oslo, a Church was built in 1868 in Cardiff Bay between the East and West Docks on land donated by the John Crichton-Stuart, 3rd Marquess of Bute, to serve the religious needs of Norwegian sailors and expatriates.

Consecrated in December 1868, the church was clad in iron sheets on the instruction of the harbourmaster, to allow it to be moved if necessary. However, the construction form allowed it to be extended many times:
1883: Reading room enlarged
1885: Gallery and bell-tower added
1894: Reading room enlarged, reclad in wood

Known until this point as the Norwegian Iron Church, it now became known as the Little White Church, and became a welcome home point for sailors. Resultantly, and open to all sailors as a mission offering food and shelter, between 1867 and 1915 the number of visiting sailors to the church rose from 7,572 to 73,580 seamen per annum.

Original Community 
When the church was in its prime it had a lot of public activity; from the Nordic community settling in Cardiff and making roots there, to the Norwegian sailors using the place as a rest stop on their travels.  The church had become a home away from home for the sailors during World War II as they weren't able to go back to Norway due to Nazi occupation. The church hosted many important family occasions, such as weddings and christenings, for the community as well as more educational projects like cookery classes.

Decline
Even pre-World War I, coal exports from Cardiff were in decline. Post World War II, shipping trade had moved from Cardiff, and in 1959 the mission's work was discontinued. In the early 1960s, the Norwegian Seamen's Mission withdrew its patronage, and the last seaman's priest Per Konrad Hansen was withdrawn. The residual congregation and other Lutheran organisations funded its continued use by the resident expatriate Norwegian community. It was closed and de-consecrated in 1974.

Preservation

In light of developments in Cardiff Bay in the late 1980s, and the proposed building of new roads around Atlantic Wharf, the now derelict and vandalised church was threatened with total destruction.

The community formed the Norwegian Church Preservation Trust, to save the building in the redeveloped docks. In partnership with the Norwegian Support Committee in Bergen, the trust raised £250,000, enabling the church to be dismantled in 1987, preserved and stored pending reassembly. The remaining original features were rescued, including the pulpit, one side-window, the chandelier and the model-ship; all of which were returned to the church.

With the Wales Millennium Centre built on its original site, with land donated by Associated British Ports, in 1992 reconstruction on the current site was started. In April 1992, the church was re-opened by Princess Märtha Louise of Norway.

Roald Dahl 
The writer Roald Dahl, who was born in Cardiff to Norwegian parents, was baptised in the church, as were his sisters. The family worshipped in the church. Throughout his life Dahl had ties with the church and in the 1970s when the church first fell into a state of disrepair, Dahl was at the forefront of a campaign to raise money to save it. This led to Dahl being appointed the first president of The Norwegian Church Preservation Trust after it was set up in 1987 by the church.

A room in the church is named 'The Dahl Gallery', in memory of Dahl and to commemorate what he did for the church. In this room is;
 The silver christening bowl used to baptise Dahl and his siblings.
 A shield given to the church's pastor as a gift, as during World War II the church was home to sailors who could not return to their homeland.
 An anchor and oars in the shape of a cross. The oars are believed to be from a Norwegian sailing ship and the anchor is a gift to honour the church's maritime heritage.

As well as this honour, Dahl is also celebrated yearly in September, the month of his 1916 birth. In 2016 Cardiff Bay celebrated the centenary of Dahl's birth, with a project launched by The Norwegian Church.

Present day
In 2006 the Norwegian Church Preservation Trust was transferred to Cardiff County Council, under the management of the Cardiff Harbour Authority.

The building is now used as an arts centre, and is known as the Norwegian Church Arts Centre. The centre includes a café and an art gallery. In May 2011 the church underwent a £500,000 refurbishment, including a new outdoor terrace and a DDA compliant lift. The Grieg room hosts a diversity of local arts and culture.

Present community 
The church has been refurbished, moved and opened in Cardiff Bay, and continues to receive a large number of visitors. Though no longer primarily a resting place and home for Norwegian sailors, it is still open to the public with a gallery and a small café for the remaining Norwegian community to relax and meet in. As the church has a strong link with Roald Dahl, every September the church honours him and his work. As well as this, the community in Cardiff and those involved with the church gather together every year for an annual celebration of Dahl's birthday and Christmas. In 2016 the Norwegian Church led Cardiff Bay's celebrations of the centenary of Dahl's birth.

Popular culture
A 2008 episode of the BBC Television drama series Torchwood, "To The Last Man", had some scenes shot outside the church.

See also
Norwegian Church, Swansea
Norwegian Fishermans' Church, Liverpool
Religion in Wales
Scandinavian churches in London
Cardiff Docks

References

External links

Official Website
Detailed History Website about The Church
Cardiff's Norwegian Heritage . Herbert E. Roese,
"Cardiff's Norwegian Church" . Herbert E. Roese
 Photograph showing the church in its original location.

Tourist attractions in Cardiff
Former churches in Cardiff
History of Cardiff
Church of Norway
Religious organizations established in 1868
Arts centres in Cardiff
19th-century Lutheran churches 
19th-century churches in the United Kingdom  
Lutheran churches in the United Kingdom
1868 establishments in Wales
Relocated buildings and structures in Wales
Rebuilt church buildings in Wales
Performing arts centres in Wales
Norwegian diaspora in Europe